Lieutenant Walter Carl Simon (1890–1971) was a World War I flying ace credited with eight aerial victories.

Biography
Flying a Bristol F.2 Fighter for the British, he and his observer scored five victories on the single day of 30 July 1918; he thus became the first American "ace in a day". When the war ended, he went to Lima, Peru, where he was promoted  to the rank of 1st Lieutenant  and  became  Vice-director of the Naval Flying School  at Ancon, headed by Captain  Juan Swayne Leguia, former RAF pilot in World War I and  son of Augusto B. Leguia, president of  Peru.

See also

 List of World War I flying aces from the United States

References

Sources of information
 The  History of Peruvian Aviation

1890s births
1971 deaths
People from New Orleans
American World War I flying aces